Potadoma liberiensis is a species of freshwater snail with an operculum, an aquatic gastropod mollusk in the family Pachychilidae.

Distribution 
This species occurs in:
 Liberia
 Ivory Coast
 Guinea

The type locality is "on rocks in the St. Paul's River near Bavia", Liberia.

References

External links 

Pachychilidae